Fusolatirus kandai is a species of sea snail, a marine gastropod mollusc in the family Fasciolariidae, the spindle snails, the tulip snails and their allies.

Description

Distribution

References

 Snyder M.A. & Bouchet P. (2006) New species and new records of deep-water Fusolatirus (Neogastropoda: Fasciolariidae) from the West Pacific. Journal of Conchology 39(1): 1–12.

Fasciolariidae
Gastropods described in 1950